Buttermilk Falls may refer to:

Canada
Buttermilk Falls (Ontario)
Buttermilk Falls, Ontario, a hamlet in Algonquin Highlands, Ontario

United States
Buttermilk Falls (Bridgewater Township, New Jersey)
Buttermilk Falls (Mendham Township, New Jersey)
Buttermilk Falls (Walpack Township, New Jersey)
Buttermilk Falls State Park, in Ithaca, New York
Buttermilk Falls (Madison County, New York)
Buttermilk Falls (Montgomery County, New York)
Buttermilk Falls (Otsego County, New York)
Buttermilk Falls (North Carolina)
Buttermilk Falls Natural Area, in Indiana County, Pennsylvania
Buttermilk Falls, a waterfall in Homewood, Pennsylvania
Buttermilk Falls, a community in Ligonier Township, Westmoreland County, Pennsylvania